Procollagen C-endopeptidase enhancer 2 is a protein that in humans is encoded by the PCOLCE2 gene.

References

Further reading